Raw milk or unpasteurized milk is milk that has not been pasteurized, a process of heating liquid foods to kill pathogens for safe consumption and extending the shelf life.

Proponents of raw milk have asserted numerous supposed benefits to consumption, including better flavor, better nutrition, contributions to the building of a healthy immune system and protection from allergies. However, no clear benefit to consumption has been found, and the medical community notes there is increased risk of contracting dangerous milk borne diseases from these products substantial evidence of this increased risk, combined with a lack of any clear benefit, has led countries around the world to either prohibit the sale of raw milk or require warning labels on packaging when sold.

In countries where it is available for sale, its availability and regulations around its sale vary. In the EU, member states can prohibit or restrict the sale of raw milk, but it is not banned outright; in some member states, the sale of raw milk through vending machines is permitted, though the packaging will typically instruct consumers to boil before consumption. In the US, some dairies have adopted low-temperature vat pasteurization, which they say produces a product similar to raw milk.

History of raw milk and pasteurization

Humans first learned to regularly consume the milk of other mammals following the domestication of animals during the Neolithic Revolution or the development of agriculture. This development occurred independently in several places around the world from as early as 9000–7000 BC in Mesopotamia to 3500–3000 BC in the Americas. The most important dairy animals—cattle, sheep and goats—were first domesticated in Mesopotamia, although domestic cattle had been independently derived from wild aurochs populations several times since.  From there dairy animals spread to Europe (beginning around 7000 BC but not reaching Britain and Scandinavia until after 4000 BC), and South Asia (7000–5500 BC).

Pasteurization is widely used to prevent infected milk from entering the food supply. The pasteurization process was developed in 1864 by French scientist Louis Pasteur, who discovered that heating beer and wine was enough to kill most of the bacteria that caused spoilage, preventing these beverages from turning sour.  The process achieves this by eliminating pathogenic microbes and lowering microbial numbers to prolong the quality of the beverage.

After sufficient scientific study led to the development of germ theory, pasteurization was introduced in the United States in the 1890s. This move successfully controlled the spread of highly contagious bacterial diseases including E. coli, bovine tuberculosis and brucellosis (all thought to be easily transmitted to humans through the drinking of raw milk). In the early days after the scientific discovery of bacteria, there was no product testing to determine whether a farmer's milk was safe or infected, so all milk was treated as potentially contagious. After the first tests were developed, some farmers took steps to prevent their infected animals from being killed and removed from food production, sometimes even falsifying test results to make their animals appear free of infection. Recent advances in the analysis of milk-borne diseases have enabled scientists to track the DNA of the infectious bacteria to the cows on the farms that supplied the raw milk.

The recognition of many potentially deadly pathogens, such as E. coli 0157 H7, Campylobacter, Listeria, and Salmonella, and their possible presence in poorly produced milk products has led to the continuation of pasteurization. The Department of Health and Human Services, Center for Disease Control and Prevention, and other health agencies of the United States strongly recommend that the public do not consume raw milk or raw milk products. Young children, the elderly, people with weakened immune systems, and pregnant women are more susceptible to infections originating in raw milk.

Uses
A number of cheeses are produced with raw milk although local statutes vary regarding what if any health precautions must be followed such as aging cheese for a certain amount of time. A large proportion of the US population eats several different cheeses made with raw milk, including aged Gouda cheese.

Many modern cheesemakers, however, use pasteurized milk for reasons of safety, compliance with regulations, or convenience.

A thick mixture known as syllabub was created by milkmaids squirting milk directly from a cow into a container of cider, beer or other beverage.

Raw yak milk is allowed to ferment overnight to become yak butter.

Health effects

Infectivity
The potential pathogenic bacteria from raw milk, include tuberculosis, diphtheria, typhoid, Campylobacter, Listeria, Brucella, E. coli, Salmonella, and streptococcal infections, make it potentially unsafe to consume. Similarly, a recent review authored by the Belgian Federal Agency for the Safety of the Food Chain and experts from Belgian universities and institutions concluded that "raw milk poses a realistic health threat due to a possible contamination with human pathogens. It is therefore strongly recommended that milk should be heated before consumption."

Even with precautions and cold storage (optimally ), raw milk has a shelf life of 3 to 5 days.

Epidemiology 
Before pasteurized milk was adopted in the US, public health officials were concerned with cow milk transmission of bovine tuberculosis to humans, with an estimated 10% of all tuberculosis cases in humans being attributed to milk consumption. Along with specific diseases, officials continue to be concerned about outbreaks. With the use of modern pasteurization and sanitation practices milk accounts for less than 1% of reported outbreaks from food and water consumption. By comparison, raw milk was associated with 25% of all disease outbreaks from food/water during the time before World War II in the U.S. From a public health standpoint, pasteurization has decreased the percentage of milk associated food/water borne outbreaks.

Outbreaks have occurred in the past from consuming food products made with raw milk. One of the potential pathogens in raw milk, Listeria monocytogenes, can survive the pasteurization process and contaminate post-pasteurization environments. Milk and dairy products made with that milk then become recontaminated. Consistent contamination persists by bacteria survival in bio-films within the processing systems.

One food item that has commonly used raw milk in its production in the past is cheese. Several different types of cheeses made with raw milk are consumed by a large portion of the United States population, including soft cheeses. Since Gouda cheese has a 60-day aging period prior to its consumption, it has previously been hypothesized that no bacteria would persist through that time. A review study published in the Journal of Food Protection showed that E. coli 0157:H7 has the ability to persist through the aging period of Gouda cheese. The study's evidence included three different outbreaks prior to 2013 associated with this specific strain of E. coli in Gouda.

Between 2007 and 2016, there were 144 outbreaks connected to raw milk consumption in the United States. Because raw milk production skips the pasteurization process, the germs that are normally removed remain in the milk product. Exposure to raw milk containing harmful germs poses a threat of infection, resulting from bacteria including Camplyobacter, Cryptosporidium, E. coli, Listeria, and Salmonella. Additionally, depending on the severity of infection, there may be further threat to human health. Infection has the potential to induce serious illness such as Guillain-Barré syndrome and Hemolytic Uremic Syndrome (HUS). Because of the vulnerability of developing and degrading immune systems, children, pregnant women, the elderly, and those who are immunocompromised are at a heightened risk of experiencing infection from raw milk consumption.

One study used mice to evaluate the difference in nutritional values between raw and pasteurized milk. Mice were separated into two groups: a pasteurized milk group and a raw milk group. Each group consisted of breeding pairs. The conclusion of the study measured no significant difference in weights of pasteurized to raw milk consuming mice. Birth weights were measured from each group and showed no significant differences between groups. Overall the study showed no measurable significant difference in nutritional value in growth and fertility of mice.

Nutrition and allergy
"With the exception of an altered organoleptic [flavor] profile, heating (particularly ultra-high temperature and similar treatments) will not substantially change the nutritional value of raw milk or other benefits associated with raw milk consumption."

Raw milk advocates, such as the Weston A. Price Foundation, say that raw milk can be produced hygienically, and that it has health benefits that are destroyed in the pasteurization process. Research shows only very slight differences in the nutritional values of pasteurized and unpasteurized milk.

Three studies have found a statistically significant inverse relationship between consumption of raw milk and asthma and allergies. However, all of these studies have been performed in children living on farms and living a farming lifestyle, rather than comparing urban children living typical urban lifestyles and with typical urban exposures on the basis of consumption or nonconsumption of raw milk. Aspects of the overall urban vs. farming environment lifestyle have been suggested as having a role in these differences, and for this reason, the overall phenomenon has been named the "farm effect". A recent scientific review concluded that "most studies alluding to a possible protective effect of raw milk consumption do not contain any objective confirmation of the raw milk's status or a direct comparison with heat-treated milk. Moreover, it seems that the observed increased resistance seems to be rather related to the exposure to a farm environment or to animals than to raw milk consumption." For example, in the largest of these studies, exposure to cows and straw as well as raw milk were associated with lower rates of asthma, and exposure to animal feed storage rooms and manure with lower rates of atopic dermatitis; "the effect on hay fever and atopic sensitization could not be completely explained by the questionnaire items themselves or their diversity."

Legal status
Regulation of the commercial distribution of packaged raw milk varies around the world. Some countries have complete bans, but many do not restrict the purchase of raw milk bought directly from the farmer. Raw milk is sometimes distributed through a program, in which the consumer owns a share in the dairy animal or the herd, and therefore can be considered to be consuming milk from their own animal, which is legal. Raw milk is sometimes marketed for animal or pet consumption, or for other uses such as soap making in places where sales for human consumption are prohibited.

Africa
Although milk consumption in Africa is fairly low compared to the rest of the world, in tribes where milk consumption is popular, such as the Maasai tribe, milk is typically consumed unpasteurized.

Asia
In rural areas of Asia where milk consumption is popular, milk is typically unpasteurized. In large cities of Asia, raw milk, especially from water buffalo, is typical. In most countries of Asia, laws prohibiting raw milk are nonexistent or rarely enforced. Milk labelled as "raw" is available in Japan, but the designation means it is 100% raw whole milk before being pasteurized. Unpasteurized milk is very uncommon in Japan. In Singapore, the sale of raw milk for human consumption is prohibited due to safety concerns outlined by the Singapore Food Agency.

In India, milk is often drunk raw, although milk supplied in major cities is sometimes pasteurized. Pasteurized or not, milk is often boiled in homes before consumption.

Europe

The European Union requires that raw milk and products made with raw milk must be labeled to indicate this. Under EU hygiene rules, member states can prohibit or restrict the placing on the market of raw milk intended for human consumption.  EU member countries are also free to implement their own requirements. Usually special sanitary regulations and frequent quality tests (at least once per month) are mandatory.

France
Raw milk cheeses make up about 18 per cent of France's total cheese production, and are considered far superior to cheeses made from pasteurised milk. Many French cuisine traditionalists consider pasteurized cheeses almost a sacrilege. Many traditional French cheeses have solely been made from raw milk for hundreds of years. Unpasteurised cheese in France is the major source of staphylococcal food poisoning.

Germany
In Germany, packaged raw milk may be sold in shops under the name . The raw milk has to be packed before vending, with the necessary information (producer, shelf life, and special warnings) written on the product.

Unpackaged raw milk may only be sold under specific conditions. It must:
 only be sold at the farm where it was produced
 be from the day of or the day before production
 have a warning label "Raw Milk – boil before use"

Packed raw milk is sold widely in all health food stores, large supermarkets, gourmet delis and delicatessen sections of department stores. Raw milk is legally sold in the entire country, and the same goes for raw milk cheeses, which are especially sought out and promoted by the health food and slow food movements.

Ireland
In the Republic of Ireland, raw milk is legal and its sale and production is regulated by the Department of Agriculture. While raw milk was previously banned in Irish law, since 2015, raw milk production has been regulated in accordance with the European Communities (Food and Feed Hygiene) Regulations (2009). The sale and consumption of raw milk has been discouraged by various food safety experts, including the Food Safety Authority of Ireland.

Nordic states
Shops are not permitted to sell unpasteurised milk to consumers in Norway, Sweden, Finland, and Denmark. All four countries allow limited "barn door" sales subject to strict controls. , just one distributor in Denmark is licensed to supply restaurants with raw milk from approved farms. Pasteurisation of milk became common practice in Denmark and Sweden in the mid-1880s.

Slovenia
Raw milk has been available from refrigerated milk vending machines all over the country since 2010. The milk sold in the machines is subject to stringent regular control.

, raw milk is also available in shops. The Slovenian National Institute of Public Health advises that consumption of fresh milk from a milk machine that is not heat-treated (boiled) can pose a risk to health.

United Kingdom

About 150 producers of raw milk are listed with the Food Standards Agency in England, Wales and Northern Ireland. They sell raw, or "green top" milk directly to consumers either at the farm, at a farmers' market, or through a delivery service, as it is legal to supply unpasteurised raw milk directly to consumers, but illegal to be sold to a shop. The bottle must display the warning "this product has not been heat-treated and may contain organisms harmful to health", and the milk must conform to higher hygiene standards than dairies producing only pasteurised milk.

It is an offence to place raw milk or cream on the market for direct consumption in Scotland, following a spate of deaths in 1983.

North America

Canada
The sale of raw milk directly to consumers has been prohibited in Canada under the Food and Drug Regulations since 1991.

Provincial laws also forbid the sale and distribution of raw milk.  For instance, Ontario's Health Protection and Promotion Act, subsection 18(1) reads: "No person shall sell, offer for sale, deliver or distribute milk or cream that has not been pasteurized or sterilized in a plant that is licensed under the Milk Act or in a plant outside Ontario that meets the standards for plants licensed under the Milk Act."

In January 2010, Michael Schmidt was found not guilty on 19 charges relating to the sale of raw milk in the Ontario Court of Justice. On appeal to the Ontario Court of Justice, that decision was overturned. Schmidt was convicted on thirteen counts and imposed fines totaling $9,150 and one year of probation. A subsequent appeal to the Ontario Court of Appeal was dismissed.

In British Columbia, Alice Jongerden, Michael Schmidt and Gordon Watson—persons involved in the operation of her raw milk dairy—attempted to avoid enforcement of a judgement against them under the Public Health Act by challenging the constitutionality of the legislation, which deems raw milk to be a hazardous product, on the grounds that it violated the Canadian Charter of Rights and Freedoms. This argument, and other defenses invoked by her and defendants in her business, was rejected in 2013 by the Supreme Court of British Columbia, which instead found Schmidt and Watson guilty of civil contempt , and sentenced them to a 3-month suspended sentence imprisonment with a probationary period of 1 year during which "Any repetition of this contempt ... will trigger the imposed sentence imprisonment of 3 months." They were also charged special costs.

Meanwhile, Canada does permit the sale of raw milk cheeses that are aged over 60 days. In 2009, the province of Quebec modified regulations to allow raw milk cheeses aged less than 60 days provided stringent safeguards are met.

United States

In the early 20th century, many states within the United States allowed the sale of raw milk that was certified by a "medical milk commission", effectively allowing an alternative of extra inspection for pasteurization. In the present day, most states impose restrictions on raw milk suppliers due to concerns about safety. 43 U.S. states allow the sale of raw milk. Cow shares can be found, and raw milk purchased for animal consumption in many states where retail for human consumption is prohibited. The sale of raw milk cheese is permitted as long as the cheese has been aged for 60 days or more.

The FDA reports that, in 2002, consuming partially heated raw milk and raw milk products caused 200 Americans to become ill in some manner.

Many governmental officials and the majority of public health organizations hold to the need for pasteurization. Before pasteurization, many dairies, especially in cities, fed their cattle on low-quality feed, resulting in the production of milk rife with dangerous bacteria. Pasteurizing it was the only way to make it safely drinkable. The Cornell University Food Science Department has compiled data indicating that pathogenic microorganisms are present in between 0.87% and 12.6% of raw milk samples.

Proponents of raw milk in the US typically argue that pasteurization destroys or damages the nutrients found in milk, and that while pasteurization may kill dangerous bacteria, it also kills off good bacteria claimed to have health benefits not present in pasteurized milk. The United States Food and Drug Administration has stated that this is false, and that pasteurizing milk does not destroy any of its nutritional value.

Proponents also invoke the benefits of direct-marketing when promoting the sale of raw milk. The ability of the farmer to eliminate the middle-man and sell directly to the consumer allows for greater profitability. Many manufacturers sell small-scale pasteurization equipment, thereby allowing farmers to both bypass the milk processors and sell pasteurized milk directly to the consumer. Additionally, some small U.S. dairies are now beginning to adopt low-temperature vat pasteurization. Advocates of low-temperature vat pasteurization note that it produces a product similar to raw milk in composition.

Food freedom advocates cite libertarian arguments in claiming a basic civil right of each person to weigh the risks and benefits in choosing the food one eats, including the choice to consume raw milk.

Oceania

Australia

The sale of raw milk for drinking purposes is illegal in all states and territories in Australia, as is all raw milk cheese. This has been circumvented somewhat by selling raw milk as bath milk. An exception to the cheese rule has been made recently for two Roquefort cheeses. There is some indication of share owning cows, allowing the "owners" to consume the raw milk, but also evidence that the government is trying to close this loophole.

On 8 November 2015, four-year-old Apu Khangura died of haemolytic uraemic syndrome, and seven other children became seriously ill, following the consumption of raw milk. In response, the Victorian government created new regulations which require producers to treat raw milk to reduce pathogens, or to make the product unpalatable to taste, such as making it bitter.

New Zealand
Raw milk for drinking and raw milk products can be made and sold in New Zealand, but are highly regulated to offset the pathogen risk. Producers of raw milk for sale to consumers must be registered. Raw milk must either be collected by the purchaser from the producer's farm or delivered to the purchaser's home.

See also
 Gut flora
 Medical ethics
 Hygiene hypothesis
 Raw foodism
 Infant food safety

References

External links
 New York Times: Should This Milk Be Legal?
 CDC: Health Risks are Still Black and White
 Risk of Consumption of Raw Milk Florida Department of Health
 FDA: Raw Milk Q & A
 FDA: The Dangers of Raw Milk
 

Milk
Raw foods
Articles containing video clips